List of flag bearers for Congo at the Olympics may refer to:

List of flag bearers for the Republic of the Congo at the Olympics
List of flag bearers for the Democratic Republic of the Congo at the Olympics